Central Heights-Midland City is an unincorporated community and census-designated place (CDP) in Gila County, Arizona, United States. The area is home to the Pinal Cemetery which serves the community in gereneral but also contains Croatian and Serbian dedicated sections. The Gila County Health and Human Services offices are located within the region. One of the communities few nurseries is located along Golden Hill Road, a notable road in the Central Heights-Midland City area. The population was 2,534 at the 2010 census.

Geography
Central Heights-Midland City is located in southern Gila County at  (33.409863, -110.816499). It is bordered to the north, east and northwest by the city of Globe, the Gila County seat, and partially to the west by the unincorporated community of Claypool. U.S. Route 60 passes just north of the CDP, within the Globe city limits, leading southeast  to the center of Globe and southwest  to the town of Miami.

Demographics

As of the census of 2000, there were 2,694 people, 1,061 households, and 758 families residing in the CDP. The racial makeup of the CDP was 87.2% White, <0.1% Black or African American, 1.0% Native American, 0.2% Asian, 0.2% Pacific Islander, 9.2% from other races, and 2.1% from two or more races.  25.4% of the population were Hispanic or Latino of any race.

There were 1,061 households, out of which 29.2% had children under the age of 18 living with them, 55.7% were married couples living together, 11.6% had a female householder with no husband present, and 28.5% were non-families. 26.0% of all households were made up of individuals, and 13.3% had someone living alone who was 65 years of age or older.  The average household size was 2.54 and the average family size was 3.02.

In the CDP, the age distribution of the population shows 26.7% under the age of 18, 7.2% from 18 to 24, 23.5% from 25 to 44, 25.9% from 45 to 64, and 16.7% who were 65 years of age or older.  The median age was 40 years. For every 100 females, there were 92.6 males.  For every 100 females age 18 and over, there were 90.5 males.

The median income for a household in the CDP was $30,577, and the median income for a family was $35,729. Males had a median income of $41,042 versus $20,139 for females. The per capita income for the CDP was $13,814.  About 14.9% of families and 16.7% of the population were below the poverty line, including 21.7% of those under age 18 and 14.8% of those age 65 or over.

References

Census-designated places in Gila County, Arizona